Miss Chinese International Pageant 1996 was held on January 27, 1996 in Hong Kong. The pageant was organized and broadcast by TVB in Hong Kong. Miss Chinese International 1995 Hsiang-Lin Ku crowned Siew-Kee Cheng of Singapore as the winner.

Pageant information
The slogan and theme to this year's pageant is "The Elegance of Yesteryears' Stars, The Vitality of Tonight's Delegates" 「昔日明星風釆  今夕佳麗風姿」.  The Masters of Ceremonies were Eric Tsang, Carol Cheng.

Results

Special awards
Miss Friendship: Winnie Young 楊婉儀 (Hong Kong)
Miss Glamour: Kaimook Pindogmai 陳珍珠 (Bangkok)

Amy Chung dethroning
In 1999, it was discovered that second runner-up Amy Chung of New York had an outstanding warrant for her arrest in USA as she left the country to enter the pageant while on probation stemming from a credit card fraud conviction.  Chung had also lied about her academic credentials, claiming to have a master's degree from Harvard University when she only has taken courses from Harvard Extension School.

When news first leaked, Chung denied all rumours and went into hiding from the Hong Kong media, performing in Mainland China.  However, she was summoned to TVB headquarters two weeks later and subsequently admitted to both her conviction and the embellishment of her educational records.  As such, Chung was stripped of her title of Miss Chinese International 1996 Second Runner-Up and had her artiste contract with TVB terminated.  Chung then returned to the US and turned herself in, where she served a 2-year prison term for her parole violation.  Her title of second runner-up has been left vacant since.

Crossovers
Contestants who previously competed or will be competing at other international beauty pageants:

Miss World
 1995:  Macau  : Geraldina Madeira da Silva Pedruco
 1995: Taipei, : Hsu Chun-Chun (representing )

References

External links
 Johnny's Pageant Page - Miss Chinese International Pageant 1996

TVB
Miss Chinese International Pageants
1996 beauty pageants
1996 in Hong Kong
Beauty pageants in Hong Kong